Morgan Meyer (born August 8, 1974) is an American politician and attorney serving as a member of the Texas House of Representatives from the 108th district. Elected in November 2014, he assumed office in January 2015. The district is entirely located within Dallas County, and includes Downtown Dallas, Uptown and the Park Cities.

Early life and education 
Meyer was born in Lubbock, Texas. He earned a Bachelor of Arts degree in political science and history from Southern Methodist University and a Juris Doctor from the Washington and Lee University School of Law.

Career 
Meyer worked as an intern for Congressman Larry Combest and as a law clerk for Judge John McClellan Marshall. Meyer has since worked as an attorney at Bracewell LLP and Wick Phillips. Meyer was elected to the Texas House of Representatives in November 2014 and assumed office in January 2015. During the 2019–2020 legislative session, Meyer was the chair of the House General Investigating Committee. In the 2021–2022 session, he is the chair of the House Ways & Means Committee.

In 2021, Meyer pushed for legislation that would extend a multibillion-dollar corporate tax incentive program in Texas. Investigative reporting by the Houston Chronicle revealed that nearly all applicants for the corporate tax incentive program had their applications approved, that dozens of companies failed to fulfill its pledges, and that some companies had already completed the projects that they had applied to the program for.

Personal life 
Meyer and his wife, Keana, have three children.

References

External links
 Campaign website
 State legislative page

1974 births
Living people
People from Lubbock, Texas
People from University Park, Texas
Southern Methodist University alumni
Washington and Lee University School of Law alumni
Republican Party members of the Texas House of Representatives
Texas lawyers